South Carolina Highway 39 (SC 39) is a  primary state highway in the U.S. state of South Carolina. The highway connects various rural communities and towns from the southwest to the northwest sections of the state.

Route description

SC 39 is a two-lane rural highway that travels  from the Savannah River Site to U.S. Route 221 (US 221) south of Laurens.

History

Established in 1922 as an original state highway, traveling from SC 12, in Monetta, to SC 21, in Edgefield. In 1923, SC 39 was extended in both directions: west to SC 20, in Modoc, and southeast to SC 4, in Springfield.  By 1926, it was extended south again to SC 27, in Williston.  The first section of SC 39 to be paved was from Johnston to Edgefield, in 1930.

In 1936, SC 39 was rerouted at Ridge Spring north through Saluda and Cross Hill, before ending at US 221, south of Laurens; it replaced a majority of SC 392, while the old alignment became an extension of SC 23.  By 1938, SC 39 was extended in both directions again: north to Ware Shoals then west to US 178, in Shoals Junction; and southwest from Williston to SC 64, in Dunbarton.

In 1940, SC 39 was extended south to SC 28/SC 282 (today's SC 125, near Millett. By 1946, all of SC 39 was paved, with its last section between SC 391 and US 1.

In 1948, SC 39 was truncated at SC 64, in Dunbarton, leaving behind existing Furse Mill Road (S-30-17) and Rolling Hills Road (S-30-24). The section of SC 39 between US 221 and Ware Shoals was downgraded to secondary roads: Indian Mound Road (S-30-6) and Power House Road (S-30-47); this also created a gap as SC 39 was still between Ware Shoals and Shoals Junction.  In 1951 or 1952, the discontinued length of SC 39 between Ware Shoals and Shoals Junction was renumbered as SC 420.  Also, during the same period, SC 39 was truncated to its current southern terminus at the Savannah River Site boundary near a realigned routing of SC 28 (today's US 278); a majority of its former route now within the Savannah River Site still exists, though sections have been removed or submerged under Par Pond.

Major intersections

Jones Crossroads connector route

South Carolina Highway 39 Connector (SC 39 Conn.) is a  connector route that connects SC 39 and SC 391 in the eastern part of Jones Crossroads and the northern part of Aiken County. It is unsigned and is signed as SC 391 itself, instead.

It begins at an intersection with the SC 39 mainline (Old Ninety-Six Indian Trail). It travels to the north-northwest and curves to the north before it reaches its northern terminus, an intersection with SC 391 (Wire Road).

See also

References

External links

 
 Mapmikey's South Carolina Highways Page: SC 39

039
Transportation in Barnwell County, South Carolina
Transportation in Orangeburg County, South Carolina
Transportation in Aiken County, South Carolina
Transportation in Saluda County, South Carolina
Transportation in Newberry County, South Carolina
Transportation in Laurens County, South Carolina